The 403d Bombardment Squadron is an inactive United States Air Force unit.  It was last assigned to the 43rd Bombardment Wing at Carswell Air Force Base, Texas, where it was inactivated on 1 January 1961.

The squadron was first activated in January 1941 as the 13th Reconnaissance Squadron, one of the original squadrons of the 43rd Bombardment Group.  Following the Attack on Pearl Harbor, the squadron participated in antisubmarine patrols until January 1942, when it moved to Australia and the Southwest Pacific Theater.  Shortly after its arrival in Australia, the squadron was redesignated the 403d Bombardment Squadron.  It moved forward with US forces through New Guinea and the Philippines, moving to Ie Shima shortly before V-J Day for operations against Japan.  It earned a Distinguished Unit Citation and a Philippine Presidential Unit Citation for combat operations.  The squadron was inactivated in the Philippines in April 1946.

The squadron was reactivated as a Strategic Air Command Boeing B-47 Stratojet unit in Arizona from 1958 to 1960.  It was activated again at Carswell in 1960 to begin conversion to the Convair B-58 Hustler, but was inactivated before becoming operational.

History

World War II

Initial organization and training
The squadron was first activated at Langley Field, Virginia as the 13th Reconnaissance Squadron, one of the original four squadrons of the 43d Bombardment Group, in the buildup of the United States military forces prior to the American entry into World War II.  It was equipped with a variety of aircraft, not only the Boeing B-17 Flying Fortress that it would fly in combat, but also Douglas B-18 Bolos and Lockheed A-29 Hudsons.
The squadron moved to Army Air Base Bangor, Maine at the end of August.  Following the Japanese attack on Pearl Harbor, the squadron conducted antisubmarine patrols off the Atlantic coast, primarily with its Bolos and Hudsons until January 1942, when it began moving to reinforce American forces in the Southwest Pacific Theater.

Combat in the Pacific

The squadron reached Australia via Cape Town in February 1942, the first of the 43d Group's four squadrons to arrive in the theater. In April 1942, the Army Air Forces (AAF) ended its practice of assigning or attaching reconnaissance squadrons to medium and heavy bombardment groups, and the squadron became the 403d Bombardment Squadron.  It was originally equipped with B-17s for combat operations.  It was not until September 1942 that the squadron reached an operational complement of aircraft and personnel.

The squadron operated from bases in Australia until November 1942, when it moved to New Guinea.  Between May and September 1942 the squadron replaced its B-17s with Consolidated B-24 Liberators, believed to be more suited to the long ranges of many Pacific missions.  It returned to Australia from January to May 1943, when it resumed operations from New Guinea, attacking Japanese shipping in the Netherlands East Indies and the Bismarck Archipelago.  It experimented with skip bombing and used this technique during the Battle of the Bismarck Sea in March 1943.  During this battle, it made repeated attacks against an enemy convoy bringing reinforcements to Japanese forces in New Guinea.  For this action, the squadron was awarded a Distinguished Unit Citation.  During this period, the squadron also provided air support for ground forces in New Guinea.  It attacked airfields and enemy installations in New Guinea, the Bismarck Archipelago, Celebes, Halmahera, Yap, Palau, and the southern Philippines.

In November 1944 the squadron moved to the Philippines, helping the ground campaign on Luzon as well as conducting bombing missions against airfields, industrial installations and enemy installations in China and Formosa. In July 1945 it moved to Ie Shima Airfield, from which it flew missions over Japan, attacking railroads and airfields, as well as shipping in the Seto Inland Sea until V-J Day.  After ceasing operations, the squadron sent its aircraft to the Philippines for reclamation and relocated to Fort William McKinley as a paper unit.  It was finally inactivated in April 1946.

Strategic Air Command

From 1958, the Boeing B-47 Stratojet wings of Strategic Air Command (SAC) began to assume an alert posture at their home bases, reducing the amount of time spent on alert at overseas bases.  The SAC alert cycle divided itself into four parts: planning, flying, alert and rest to meet General Thomas S. Power’s initial goal of maintaining one third of SAC’s planes on fifteen minute ground alert, fully fueled and ready for combat to reduce vulnerability to a Soviet missile strike.  To implement this new system B-47 wings reorganized from three to four squadrons.  The 403d was activated at Davis-Monthan Air Force Base as the fourth squadron of the 43d Bombardment Wing.  In March 1960, the 43rd Wing moved to Carswell Air Force Base, Texas to become the Air Force's first Convair B-58 Hustler wing, and the squadron was discontinued. Two months later, on 15 May, he squadron was organized at Carswell, but it was inactivated on 1 January 1961, before becoming operational.

Lineage
 Constituted as the 13th Reconnaissance Squadron (Heavy) on 20 November 1940
 Activated on 15 January 1941
 Redesignated 403d Bombardment Squadron (Heavy) on 22 April 1942
 Redesignated 403d Bombardment Squadron, Heavy on 21 September 1943
 Inactivated on 29 April 1946
 Redesignated 403d Bombardment Squadron, Medium on 20 August 1958
 Activated on 1 December 1958
 Discontinued on 15 March 1960
 Organized on 15 May 1960
 Discontinued and inactivated on 1 January 1961

Assignments
 43rd Bombardment Group, 15 January 1941 – 29 April 1946
 43rd Bombardment Wing, 1 December 1958 – 15 March 1960
 Strategic Air Command, 12 April 1960 (not organized)
 43rd Bombardment Wing, 15 May 1960 – 1 January 1961

Stations

 Langley Field, Virginia, 15 January 1941
 Army Air Base, Bangor, Maine, 30 August 1941 – 18 January 1942
 Essendon Airport,Melbourne, Victoria, Australia, 27 February 1942
 RAAF Laverton, Victoria, Australia, 14 March 1942
 Longreach Airport, Torrens Creek, Queensland, Australia, 27 August 1942
 Iron Range Airfield, Queensland, Australia, c. 17 October 1942
 Gurney Airfield, Milne Bay, Papua New Guinea, 23 November 1942
 Mareeba Airfield, Queensland, Australia, c. 21 January 1943
 Jackson Airfield, Port Moresby, Papua New Guinea, c. 11 May 1943
 Dobodura Airfield, Papua New Guinea, c. 13 December 1943
 Nadzab Airfield, Papua New Guinea, 12 March 1944
 Owi Airfield, Schouten Islands, Netherlands East Indies, 28 July 1944
 Tacloban Airfield, Leyte, Philippines, C. 19 November 1944
 Clark Field, Luzon, Philippines, c. 15 March 1945
 Ie Shima Airfield, Okinawa, Ryuku Islands, 22 July 1945
 Fort William McKinley, Luzon, Philippines, 11 December 1945 – 29 April 1946
 Davis-Monthan Air Force Base, Arizona, 1 December 1958 – 15 March 1960
 Carswell Air Force Base, Texas, 15 May 1960 – 1 January 1961

Aircraft

 Boeing B-17 Flying Fortress, 1941, 1942–1943
 Douglas B-18 Bolo, 1941–1942
 Lockheed A-29 Hudson, 1941–1942
 Consolidated B-24 Liberator, 1942–1945
 Boeing B-47 Stratojet, 1958–1960
 Convair B-58 Hustler, 1960

Awards and campaigns

See also
 United States Army Air Forces in Australia
 B-17 Flying Fortress units of the United States Army Air Forces
 B-24 Liberator units of the United States Army Air Forces
 List of B-47 units of the United States Air Force

References
 Explanatory notes

 Citations

Bibliography

 
 
 
 
 
 

Bombardment squadrons of the United States Air Force
Bombardment squadrons of the United States Army Air Forces
Military units and formations established in 1941
Units and formations of Strategic Air Command
Military units and formations of the United States in the Cold War
World War II strategic bombing units